Passion of Mind is a 2000 American drama film starring Demi Moore. It was the first English-language film from Belgian director Alain Berliner, best known for the arthouse success Ma Vie en Rose (1997). The film was panned by critics and became a box-office bomb, grossing just $769,272 against its $12 million budget. Moore received a nomination for the Golden Raspberry Award for Worst Actress for her roles.

Plot

Marty is a single, high-powered literary agent in Manhattan. Marie is a widow who lives a peaceful life in Provence, France with her two daughters. When Marie falls asleep she dreams that she is Marty and when Marty falls asleep she dreams that she is Marie.  Marty has been seeing a therapist to deal with her vivid dreams of Marie's life. Marie also sees a therapist, and confides in her older friend, Jessie, but she is much less disturbed by the dream life. 

Each woman is convinced that the other is a figment of her imagination. Marty's New York psychiatrist, Dr. Peters, feels that she is lonely in her busy life and wants to live a simple life with children to love. Marie’s French psychiatrist, Dr. Langer, feels that she wants more than a drab home life and longs to lead a more exciting one.

Through a business deal, Marty meets Aaron, an accountant. They become friends and eventually lovers. Terrified that her vivid other life means that she's losing her mind, Marty doesn't want to tell Aaron about it but finally does. Marie, meanwhile, has met and fallen in love with William, a writer. She too is reluctant to tell William about her dreams, particularly because she (as Marty) is falling in love with Aaron, but realizes that she cannot keep such an important part of her life a secret.

The two men react very differently: William is jealous, and Aaron is skeptical but not at all threatened, and wants only for Marty to be happy. Dreams and reality begin to merge when Marie goes on holiday with William to Paris, and Marty wakes up with an ashtray from the hotel on her night stand. Eventually Marty/Marie must come to terms with reality and choose which life is real and which is illusion.

Along the way, Marty and Marie find clues from each other's lives in each world. Yet, the real, tangible things are always found in the New York world. Eventually, she realizes that her New York Life is real and her French life is a dream. Marie's two daughters are herself when she was 7 and 11. Her friend, Jessie, is her memory of her mother who died when she was eleven.

Marty gives Aaron her journals as a way to understand her better.

Cast
Demi Moore as Martha Marie / 'Marty' Talridge
Julianne Nicholson as Kim
William Fichtner as Aaron Reilly
Sinéad Cusack as Jessie
Joss Ackland as Dr. Langer, the French psychiatrist
Peter Riegert as Dr. Peters, the New York psychiatrist
Stellan Skarsgård as William Granther
Eloise Eonnet as Jennifer 'Jenny' Talridge
Gerry Bamman as Edward 'Ed' Youngerman

Reception
Passion of Mind garnered negative reviews from critics. Review aggregator Rotten Tomatoes gave it a 19% approval rating, based on 36 reviews, with an average score of 4/10. On Metacritic, the film has a weighted average score of 28 out of 100, based on 27 critics, indicating "generally unfavorable reviews".

Emanuel Levy, writing for Variety, criticized Bass and Field's "narrowly-scoped, undernourished script" for taking its main concept and explained it in "a more rational and clinical way", but praised Berliner and his production crew for constructing "workable tension" during the first half with "impressive mise-en-scene" and "smooth transitions" between the two different lives and the performances of Moore, Skarsgård and Fichtner, concluding that: "Due to them, "Passion of Mind" is more successful and enjoyable as a variation on the prevalent screen theme of romantic triangle than as a psychological case of split personality." Marjorie Baumgarten of The Austin Chronicle was also critical of the "woefully underwritten" script telling "a preposterous story" with an unearned "explanatory climax", but gave praise to Moore, Skarsgård and Fichtner, saying they "perform ably and strike more than a few pleasant moments in this otherwise forgettable drama." Roger Ebert felt the screenplay paled in comparison to the similarly premised Me Myself I when constructing its story with supernatural and multiple personality elements, saying it gave unanswered questions that overshadow the content and leads to an "unconvincingly neat" conclusion. Entertainment Weeklys Lisa Schwarzbaum gave the film a "D+" grade, calling it "a weirdly rococo and psychologically nonsensical application" of the "folks surfing the space-time/living-dead continuum" formula that was previously used by Frequency, Me Myself I and Sliding Doors.

Moore was nominated for a Golden Raspberry Award for Worst Actress for her roles, but lost to Madonna for The Next Best Thing.

References

External links
 
 

2000 films
2000s American films
2000s English-language films
2000 romantic drama films
American mystery films
American romantic drama films
Films directed by Alain Berliner
Films produced by Tom Rosenberg
Films produced by Gary Lucchesi
Films scored by Randy Edelman
Films set in France
Films set in Manhattan
Films with screenplays by Ronald Bass
Lakeshore Entertainment films